Gorna Goricë (Macedonian/Bulgarian: Горна Горица), previously officially known as Goricë e Madhe, is a village in the Pustec Municipality which is officially recognised as a Macedonian minority zone located in the Korçë County in Albania. It is situated west of Lake Prespa and the village of Tuminec, and northwest of the village of Dolna Gorica. The village is composed of ethnic Macedonians, which form part of the larger Macedonian minority in Albania. According to Bulgarian sources, including research by a Bulgarian scientist from Albania, the local inhabitants are Bulgarians.

History
Gorna Gorica is a proposed location of a fortified town called Pellion of the ancient Greek tribe of the Dexaroi. The site later became an ancient Macedonian fortress.

In the late 19th century, the village came under the Bulgarian Exarchate. According to the exarchate, the village had 33 houses and 404 Orthodox Christian residents at that time. The "La Macédoine et sa Population Chrétienne" survey by Dimitar Mishev (D. Brankov) concluded that village had 360 Bulgarian Exarchists residents in 1905.

In 2013, the village's official name was changed from "Goricë e Madhe" to "Gorna Gorica".

Demographics

References

Chaonia
Ancient Greek archaeological sites in Albania
Populated places in Pustec Municipality
Albania–North Macedonia border crossings
Villages in Korçë County
Macedonian communities in Albania